Francis Ouma (born March 23, 1988) is a Kenyan football player who plays for Sony Sugar in the Tusker Premier League as a striker.

Career 
Ouma began his career with Mathare United, with whom he won the 2008 Kenyan Premier League and finished as top goalscorer, with 15 goals. He joined Parma after the end of the season.  In 2009, he was loaned to G.D. Tourizense, but returned to Kenya 2 years later when he joined Sofapaka, before returning to his former club Mathare United in 2012. He finished the 2012 Kenyan Premier League season with 9 goals for his club, making him the joint 9th top scorer.

On 12 December 2012, Ouma signed for Sony Sugar for an undisclosed fee, along with his former Mathare United teammate John Kio.

References

External links
 

1988 births
Living people
Kenyan footballers
Kenya international footballers
Place of birth missing (living people)
Sofapaka F.C. players
Azam F.C. players
SoNy Sugar F.C. players

Association football forwards